Cam de Leon (born 1961 in Modesto, California) is an American artist who specializes in surreal, dark imagery. He is best known for creating the artwork for Tool's 1991 demo EP 72826, the EP Opiate and the Ænima album, as well as working as a digital illustrator, doing concept and visual development and character design for the feature animation industry. He worked as a digital illustrator for movies such as Ghostbusters, Hook, The Sum of All Fears and The Cat in the Hat. He also worked with Nvidia on various techdemos. In 2005, he published the first compendium of his work entitled The Art and Imagery of Cam de Leon.

References

External links
 camdeleon.com - official website
 Cam de Leon- myartspace.com interview with Brian Sherwin
 Cam de Leon - Surreal Art Collective

American speculative fiction artists
Living people
People from Modesto, California
Artists from California
Fantasy artists
1961 births